Télésat, formerly known as Télésat Numérique, is a satellite subscription television provider owned by M7 Group aimed at the French-speaking community of Belgium and Luxembourg, which also offers a triple play package of satellite television, internet and landline telephone services. In september 2019, M7 Group was bought by Vivendi's Canal+ Group. In 2020 the legal entity M7 Group S.A. changed its name into Canal+ Luxembourg S.a.r.l. while its groupbrand name remains M7 Group.

In 2010 the operator added the possibility to add a selection of Flemish stations to a client's subscription by adding the option "Espace TV Vlaanderen" at an additional monthly cost but which requires a triple LNB or motorised satellite dish.

References

External links 
 Télésat Belgium
 Télésat Luxembourg

M7 Group
Direct broadcast satellite services
Private equity portfolio companies
Providence Equity Partners companies
Television in Belgium
Television in Luxembourg